Rick Celebrini (born October 16, 1967) is a retired Canadian soccer player who is the physiotherapist and head of sports medicine and science for the Vancouver Whitecaps FC, and director of sports medicine and performance for the Golden State Warriors.  

Celebrini played for the Canadian U-20 national team at the 1987 FIFA World Youth Championship.  He played professionally for the Vancouver 86ers. Celebrini is also a founder and the Director of Sport Medicine and Science for the Fortius Institute.

Player

In 1985, Celebrini began his collegiate soccer career at Capilano University. In 1986, Capilano finished third in the Canadian Colleges Athletic Association Soccer Championship.  In 1987, Celebrini transferred to the University of British Columbia, but was out of soccer for nearly two years after breaking his left foot.  During his five seasons with the Thunderbirds (1988-1992), Celebrini and his team mates won four consecutive Canadian Interuniversity Sport men's soccer championship.  In 1992, he graduated with a degree in physiotherapy. In 1987 and 1989, Celebrini played for the Edmonton Brick Men of the Canadian Soccer League during the collegiate off seasons and played with the Vancouver 86ers in 1992. On April 22, 1993 signed Vancouver 86ers of the American Professional Soccer League. He remained with Vancouver through the 1996 season, but was hampered by injuries during most of those years.

In 1987, Celebrini earned four caps with the Canadian U-20 national team which competed at the 1987 FIFA World Youth Championship. He also played for the Canadian team at the 1993 Summer Universiade.

Physiotherapist 

Celebrini first became interested in physiotherapist after breaking his ankle when he was fifteen and receiving therapy at the same clinic which treated professional athletes. His interest was reinforced after a broken left foot kept him from playing for two years. After graduating from the University of British Columbia in 1992, Celebrini pursued a career as a physiotherapist in addition to playing professionally. He became the team physiotherapist for the Canadian Alpine Men's Ski Team at the 1994 Winter Olympics and 2002 Winter Olympics. In 2010, he was the chief therapist and medical manager at the 2010 Winter Olympics. On July 29, 2011, the Vancouver Whitecaps FC hired Celebrini as the team's physiotherapist. In August 2018 he became the director of sports medicine and performance for the Golden State Warriors.

Director of sport medicine and science
Celebrini is a co-founder and partner in the Fortius Institute and senior member in the leadership team behind Fortius Sport & Health. The Fortius Institute is an integrated team of sport medicine, science and training leaders committed to best practices in prevention, performance, treatment, education and research.

References

External links
 
 
 FortiusSport.com: Fortius Institute
 FortiusSport.com: Dr. Rick Celebrini 

1967 births
Living people
American Professional Soccer League players
Canadian soccer players
Canadian people of Italian descent
Canadian Soccer League (1987–1992) players
Edmonton Brick Men players
Vancouver Whitecaps (1986–2010) players
Sportspeople from Burnaby
UBC Thunderbirds soccer players
Capilano University alumni
Canada men's youth international soccer players
Vancouver Whitecaps FC non-playing staff
Association football defenders
Association football physiotherapists